The 1887 All-Ireland Senior Hurling Championship Final was a hurling match that was played at Birr Sportsfield, Birr on 1 April 1888 to determine the winners of the 1887 All-Ireland Senior Hurling Championship, the first season of the All-Ireland Senior Hurling Championship, a tournament organised by the Gaelic Athletic Association for inter-county hurling teams in Ireland. The final was contested by club representatives Thurles Blues of Tipperary and Meelick of Galway, with Tipperary winning by 1–1 (and a forfeit point) to 0–00.

The All-Ireland final between Tipperary and Galway was a unique occasion as it was the first ever championship meeting between the two teams.

Patrick White, a native of Blakefield, Toomevara and the first secretary of Offaly County G.A.A. Board. was the referee. 

Tipperary's clash with Galway proved to be their toughest championship test yet. At a crucial stage in the second-half team captain Jim Stapleton led a charge down the field. Spotting a free player he passed the sliotar to Tom Healy who went on to score the first goal in an All-Ireland final.

Tipperary's All-Ireland victory was their first in what would be a remarkable record of securing an All-Ireland title in every decade. Tipperary also held a record of never losing an All Ireland Final from 1887 to 1909.

Match

Details

References

1
All-Ireland Senior Hurling Championship Finals
April 1888 sports events
Galway county hurling team matches
Tipperary county hurling team matches